James Baird Montgomerie  (20 July 1894 – 22 March 1987) was a Scottish-Canadian soccer centre half back who played in Canada and the United States. He was a veteran of World War I, serving in the Canadian Army and winning the Military Cross with bar.

Born in Scotland, Montgomerie was playing in Montreal by 1915 when he was part of the Montreal All Star team which lost to the Toronto All Stars during their annual inter-city clash. At that time, he played for Highlanders. When World War I began, Montgomerie entered the Canadian Army and was assigned to the 42nd Battalion. During that war, he served as a lieutenant and won the Military Medal and the Military Cross with bar. After the war, he returned to Canada. In 1922, he played for Montreal's Grenadier Guards when they won the Quebec Cup. In 1924, Montgomerie moved south to join the New Bedford Whalers of the American Soccer League. He remained with the Whalers until the fall of 1931, aside from six games with the Fall River Marksmen in the spring of 1931.

External links

References

1894 births
1987 deaths
American Soccer League (1921–1933) players
Fall River Marksmen players
New Bedford Whalers players
Canadian recipients of the Military Cross
Canadian recipients of the Military Medal
Scottish footballers
Scottish expatriate footballers
Association football defenders
Scottish expatriate sportspeople in the United States
Expatriate soccer players in the United States